A number of motor vessels have been named Panagia Tinou, including –

, a  ferry in service 1981–90
, a  ferry in service 2015–16
, a  ferry in service 2002–09

See also
, a  ferry in service 1992–96

Ship names